The Cactus Kid is a 1921 American short silent Western film directed by Lee Kohlmar and featuring Hoot Gibson.

Cast
 Hoot Gibson
 Charles Newton
 Ben Corbett
 Connie Henley
 Duke R. Lee

See also
 Hoot Gibson filmography
 List of American films of 1921

External links
 

1921 films
1921 Western (genre) films
1921 short films
American silent short films
American black-and-white films
Films directed by Lee Kohlmar
Silent American Western (genre) films
1920s American films
1920s English-language films